Prionovolva is a genus of sea snails, marine gastropod mollusks in the family Ovulidae.

Species
Species within the genus Prionovolva include:
 Prionovolva brevis (Sowerby, 1828)
 Prionovolva choshiensis (Cate, 1973)
 Prionovolva freemani Liltved & Millard, 1994
 Prionovolva melonis Rosenberg, 2010

Synonymized species  
 Prionovolva aenigma Azuma & Cate, 1971: synonym of Habuprionovolva aenigma (Azuma & Cate, 1971)
 Prionovolva aureomarginata Shikama, 1973: synonym of Pseudosimnia pyrulina (A. Adams, 1854)
 Prionovolva brevis sensu Allan, 1956 : synonym of Testudovolva nipponensis (Pilsbry, 1913)
 Prionovolva castanea Cate, 1978: synonym of Prionovolva brevis (Sowerby, 1828)
 Prionovolva cavanaghi Schilder, 1941: synonym of Globovula cavanaghi (Iredale, 1931)
 Prionovolva ericae Cossignani & Calo, 2002: synonym of Testudovolva ericae (Cossignani & Calo, 2002)
 Prionovolva fruticum (Reeve, 1865) : synonym of Prionovolva brevis (Sowerby, 1828)
 Prionovolva nebula Azuma & Cate, 1971 : synonym of Testudovolva nebula (Azuma & Cate, 1971)
 Prionovolva nivea Cate, 1974: synonym of Prionovolva brevis (G. B. Sowerby I, 1828)
 Prionovolva nubeculata (Sowerby in A. Adams & Reeve, 1848) : synonym of Prionovolva brevis (Sowerby, 1828)
 Prionovolva pudica: synonym of Prionovolva brevis (Sowerby, 1828)
 Prionovolva pulchella (H. Adams, 1873): synonym of Testudovolva pulchella H. Adams, 1874
 Prionovolva wilsoniana Cate, 1973: synonym of Prionovolva brevis (Sowerby, 1828)

References

Ovulidae